Helen Kennedy (born 1958) is a Canadian politician and social activist. She is the executive director of Egale Canada.

Background

Born in Ireland, she came to Canada in 1979 at age 21.

Kennedy began her career as an activist and change agent with the Industrial Accident Prevention Association, where she became an advocate for workplace safety and people with disabilities, building awareness as editor of the association's magazine. In 1985, she was hired by the Ontario New Democratic Party caucus at Queen's Park. She served the party for 14 years, in opposition and government. During that time, Kennedy founded the East York Tenants Association, which lobbied for rent controls and tenant rights. She also established Citizens for Access, an awareness campaign to open up public buildings to people with disabilities.

Municipal politics

In 1988, she successfully ran for city councillor in East York. Her campaign was the first in Canada to provide campaign literature on tape for the blind. She served until 1991, leaving due to the increased demands of her position at Queen's Park when the NDP won the provincial election and formed the government.

In 1999, Kennedy joined Toronto City Councillor Olivia Chow's team at City Hall, as constituency assistant in Ward 20. Following Chow's resignation from city council to run in the 2006 federal election, Kennedy submitted her nomination as a candidate for the municipal elections with Chow's endorsement. In additional to Chow, Kennedy's candidacy was also endorsed by Green Party of Canada leader Elizabeth May and Conservative Senator Nancy Ruth. The seat was won by Adam Vaughan, a former political reporter with Citytv.

Egale

In April 2007, she was named executive director of Egale Canada. She is the first woman to head the organization.

References

1958 births
Living people
Ontario municipal councillors
LGBT municipal councillors in Canada
Canadian LGBT rights activists
Lesbian politicians
Irish emigrants to Canada
Women municipal councillors in Canada
Women in Ontario politics
20th-century Canadian politicians
20th-century Canadian women politicians
20th-century Canadian LGBT people
21st-century Canadian politicians
21st-century Canadian women politicians
21st-century Canadian LGBT people